The University of Tokyo Library in Tokyo, Japan, consists of the General Library, the Komaba Library, and the Kashiwa Library.

The University of Tokyo (UTokyo) library has the largest collection in Japan, holding a total of over 8,000,000 books.

Branches

General Library

The General Library provides service to all the researchers and students of UTokyo, along with administrative support for the other branch libraries.  The library houses approximately 1,090,000 books  The library has a history of nearly 130 years since its opening in 1878.

The General Library is open to faculty members, graduate students, undergraduate students, auditors, personnel, and others who have been approved by the director. Former faculty members, personnel, and alumni are also allowed to use it.

ILL service provides access to the holding of the General Library through interlibrary loan of original material.  Loan service is available to university libraries in Japan.

Komaba Library
Komaba Library mainly supports the studies of the first two years of undergraduate education.

Faculty members, graduate students, undergraduate students, auditors, others who have requested use from outside the university, and others who have been approved by the director can use the Komaba Library

Kashiwa Library
Opened in 2004, Kashiwa Library is a library devoted to the natural sciences. All the books in Kashiwa Library can be searched on OPAC.

Faculty members, graduate students, undergraduate students, auditors, others who have requested use from outside the university, and others who have been approved by the director can use the Kashiwa Library.

Major Collections
The UTokyo Library houses many collections.  Some collections are searchable through OPAC, though most are available only through card catalogue.

 Akiba Collection: Collector: Akiba, Yoshimi (1896–1952). Content: Shibai Banzuke (list of the title and the casts of the Kabuki presented on the stage) during the Empo-Meiji eras. 16,831 volumes.
 Katei Collection: Collector: Watanabe, Katei (1864–1926) Content: Japanese fictions in the Edo period. 1,851 volumes.
 Nanki Collection: Collector: Tokugawa, Yorimichi  (1872–1925)  Content: Collection of Tokugawa, the feudal lord of Kii Province (including Yoshunro-bon, Sakata-bon, Gakkai-bon). 96,000 volumes.
 Ogai Collection: Collector: Mori, Ogai (1862–1922). Content: Biographical or historical books, Bukan (directory of Daimyo and Hatamoto), old maps in the Edo period, European literature. 18,700 volumes.
 Seishu Collection: Collector: Watanabe, Makoto (1840–1911). Content: Chinese classics and Japanese literature. 25,000 volumes.
 Material of the Society of National Policy: Collector: Minobe, Yoji (1900–1953). Content: Literature on politics and economic policy during the World War II. 6,624 volumes.

ILL Service for Non-University Members
Inter-library loan & delivery service between libraries in the campuses is available for researchers as teachers and graduates (some libraries are excluded).

Online Resources

Online Catalogs
 OPAC (Online Public Access Catalog) / Multilingual OPAC
 Book Contents Database
The Book Contents Database allows you to search for books held in the libraries of the University of Tokyo by looking at their tables of contents or information taken from their summaries and dust jackets. This gives you access to the actual content of the books, which was previously unavailable through the conventional OPAC system. Approximately 229,820 volumes (Japanese:164,319 English:65,501, as of 2004.11) of books/materials held by the University of Tokyo can be searched.

 Doctoral Dissertation Database
The database of bibliographies and abstracts of dissertations/theses, which were granted by the University of Tokyo. The database includes bibliographies from 1957, and abstracts after 1994. Guide to the locations of dissertations is also displayed.

 Database of newspapers available at the University of Tokyo
Search for newspapers held in the University of Tokyo libraries.

Faculty/Institution Library's Online Catalogs

General library 

 List of Microforms held at the General Library
 Database of the Tibetan Tripitaka Card Catalog
 Catalog of Classical Chinese Books (approx. 10,000 records)
 Institute of Oriental Culture
 Catalogue of Classical Chinese Books in the IOC (before 2001)
 The Digital library of Classical Chinese Books
 Historiographical Institute
 - Historiographical Institute Historical Documents Catalog (historical documents other than books)

References

External links 
  The University of Tokyo Library website (Japanese)
  The University of Tokyo Library website (English)
  Online Public Access Catalog (OPAC, Japanese)
  Online Public Access Catalog (OPAC, English)

Libraries in Tokyo
University of Tokyo
Academic libraries in Japan